The Huldschinsky Madonna is a tempera and gold on panel painting by Carlo Crivelli, executed c. 1460, and signed "OPVS KAROLI CRIVELLI VENETI". It is now in the San Diego Museum of Art. It is dated early in the artist's career, during or just after his stay in Padua in Francesco Squarcione's studio. There is a copy of the work with several variations signed "Opus P. Petri", who Roberto Longhi argued to be Pietro Calzetta, another Paduan School painter.

It is recorded in the Greek royal collections in Athens before passing into the Dohna-Mallmitz Collection and then the Huldschinsky Collection in Berlin, which gave it its name. In 1906 it was displayed at the Kaiser Friedrich Museum and twenty years later it was bought from the Huldschinsky Collection by Colnaghi in London and then Harding in New York before reaching its present home in 1947.

References

1460 paintings
Paintings of the Madonna and Child by Carlo Crivelli
Paintings in the collection of the San Diego Museum of Art